The Harris-Tingey House, at 269 E. Center St. in Centerville, Utah, was listed on the National Register of Historic Places in 1997.

Its original portion, built around 1869, is a one-story Classical stone house with gable end brick chimneys, with a hall-parlor plan.  It was probably built by carpenter John J. Harris, perhaps with stonemason Charles Duncan. A brick addition to the rear was added around 1890.

References

National Register of Historic Places in Davis County, Utah
Georgian architecture in Utah
Houses completed in 1869